Kayula Kakusa (born 4 March 1964) is a Zambian politician. He served as Member of the National Assembly for Kabwe Central from 2006 until 2011.

Biography
Kakusa contested the 2006 general elections as the Movement for Multi-Party Democracy (MMD) candidate in Kabwe Central. In a close three-way contest, he was elected, defeating Davies Chama of the Patriotic Front by 171 votes, succeeding the MMD's Patrick Musonda as the MP for Kabwe.

Kakusa did not stand for re-election in the 2011 general elections. The MMD subsequently lost the seat to James Kapyanga of the Patriotic Front.

References

1964 births
Living people
Movement for Multi-Party Democracy politicians
Members of the National Assembly of Zambia